Moussa M'Bengue (born 3 January 1955) is a former Senegalese basketball player. M'Bengue competed for Senegal at the 1980 Summer Olympics, where he scored 7 points in 6 games.

References

1955 births
Living people
Senegalese men's basketball players
Olympic basketball players of Senegal
Basketball players at the 1980 Summer Olympics